The OPTi 929 is a sound chip designed by OPTi Inc. that was integrated onto sound cards sold in the early to mid-1990s.  It provides Sound Blaster and AdLib compatibility, as well sample-based synthesis through the MPU-401 interface.  The set of samples is on a ROM chip.

References

Sound chips